Route 305 is a collector road in the Canadian province of Nova Scotia.

It is located in the Cape Breton Regional Municipality and connects Little Bras d'Or at Highway 105 with Westmount at Trunk 4. It was originally known as Trunk 5 until 1970. In the 1960s  between Point Edward and Sydney River this highway was also used for Nova Scotia Highway 125.

Communities

Little Bras d'Or
Florence
Sydney Mines
North Sydney
Coxheath
Westmount
Sydney River

See also
List of Nova Scotia provincial highways

References

Nova Scotia provincial highways
Roads in the Cape Breton Regional Municipality